Senator Dow may refer to:

Albert G. Dow (1808–1908), New York State Senate
Chuck Dow (1931–2015), Maine State Senate
Dana Dow (fl. 1960s–2010s), Maine State Senate